The South African Maintenance and Estate Beneficiaries Association (SAMEBA) is a South African political party. Their platform is made up of two main elements; child maintenance and beneficiaries of estates.

The party contested the 2014 general election in Limpopo province and contested the 2019 general election, failing to win any seats.

Election results

National elections

|-
! Election
! Total votes
! Share of vote
! Seats 
! +/–
! Government
|-
! 2019
| 2,445
| 0.01%
| 
| –
| 
|}

Provincial elections

! rowspan=2 | Election
! colspan=2 | Eastern Cape
! colspan=2 | Free State
! colspan=2 | Gauteng
! colspan=2 | Kwazulu-Natal
! colspan=2 | Limpopo
! colspan=2 | Mpumalanga
! colspan=2 | North-West
! colspan=2 | Northern Cape
! colspan=2 | Western Cape
|- 
! % !! Seats
! % !! Seats
! % !! Seats
! % !! Seats
! % !! Seats
! % !! Seats
! % !! Seats
! % !! Seats
! % !! Seats
|- 
! 2014 
| – || –
| – || –
| – || –
| – || –
| 0.08% || 0/49
| – || –
| – || –
| – || –
| – || –
|}

Municipal elections

|-
! Election
! Votes
! %
|-
! 2016
| 5,637
| 0.01%
|-
|}

References 

Political parties in South Africa